Karl Patterson Schmidt (June 19, 1890  – September 26, 1957) was an American herpetologist.

Family
Schmidt was the son of George W. Schmidt and Margaret Patterson Schmidt. George W. Schmidt was a German professor, who, at the time of Karl Schmidt's birth, was teaching in Lake Forest, Illinois. His family left the city in 1907 and settled in Wisconsin. They worked on a farm near Stanley, Wisconsin, where his mother and his younger brother died in a fire on August 7, 1935. The brother, Franklin J. W. Schmidt, had been prominent in the then-new field of wildlife management.  Karl Schmidt married Margaret Wightman in 1919, and they had two sons, John and Robert.

Education
In 1913, Schmidt entered Cornell University to study biology and geology. In 1915, he discovered his preference for herpetology during a four-month training course at the Perdee Oil Company in Louisiana. In 1916, he received the degree of Bachelor of Arts and made his first geological expedition to Santo Domingo. In 1952 he was awarded an honorary Doctor of Science degree by Earlham College.

Career
From 1916 to 1922, he worked as scientific assistant in herpetology at the American Museum of Natural History in New York, under the well-known American herpetologists Mary Cynthia Dickerson and Gladwyn K. Noble. He made his first collecting expedition to Puerto Rico in 1919, then became the assistant curator of reptiles and amphibians at the Field Museum of Natural History in Chicago in 1922. From 1923 to 1934, he made several collecting expeditions for that museum to Central and South America, which took him to Honduras (1923), Brazil (1926) and Guatemala (1933–1934). In 1937, he became the editor of the herpetology and ichthyology journal Copeia, a post he occupied until 1949. In 1938, he served in the U.S. Army. He became the chief curator of zoology at the Field Museum in 1941, where he remained until his retirement in 1955. From 1942 to 1946, he was the president of the American Society of Ichthyologists and Herpetologists. In 1953, he made his last expedition, which was to Israel.

Death
On September 26, 1957, Schmidt was accidentally bitten by a juvenile boomslang snake (Dispholidus typus) at his lab at the Field Museum. Marlin Perkins, the director of the Lincoln Park Zoo, had sent the snake to Schmidt's lab for identification. Schmidt wrongly believed that the snake could not produce a fatal dose because of its age and the fact that Boomslangs are rear-fanged. The bite occurred because he had held the snake in an unsafe manner. Boomslang venom causes disseminated intravascular coagulation, a condition in which so many small clots form in the blood that the victim loses the ability to clot further and bleeds to death.

Later that evening, Schmidt felt slightly ill. By the next morning, the lethal effects of the venom rapidly became evident. He did not report to work, and at noon, he reported to the museum that he was very ill. He soon collapsed at his home in Homewood, Illinois, bleeding in his lungs, kidneys, heart, and brain, and was dead on arrival at Ingalls Memorial Hospital. Following the bite, he took detailed notes on the symptoms that he experienced, almost until death. Schmidt was asked just a few hours before he died if he wanted medical care, but he refused because it would disrupt the symptoms that he was documenting.

Legacy
Schmidt was one of the most important herpetologists in the 20th century. Though he made only a few important discoveries by himself, he named more than 200 species and was a leading expert on coral snakes. His donation of over 15,000 titles of herpetological literature formed the foundation for The Karl P. Schmidt Memorial Herpetological Library located at the Field Museum.

His writings reveal that he was generally a solid supporter of a W. D. Matthew brand of dispersalism of species.

Taxa

Species and subspecies named for Karl Schmidt
Many species and subspecies of amphibians and reptiles are named in his honor, including:

Acanthodactylus schmidti Haas, 1957
Afrotyphlops schmidti (Laurent, 1956)
Amphisbaena schmidti Gans, 1964
Aspidoscelis hyperythra schmidti Van Denburgh & Slevin, 1921
Batrachuperus karlschmidti , 1950
Calamaria schmidti  & Inger, 1955
Coniophanes schmidti Bailey, 1937
Eleutherodactylus karlschmidti C. Grant, 1931
Emoia schmidti , 1954
Lerista karlschmidti (Marx & Hosmer, 1959)
Liolaemus schmidti (Marx, 1960)
Pseudoxenodon karlschmidti Pope, 1928
Scincella schmidti Barbour, 1927
Thrasops schmidti Loveridge, 1936
Tribolonotus schmidti Burt, 1930
Urosaurus ornatus schmidti (Mittleman, 1940)
Varanus karlschmidti Mertens, 1951

Some taxa described by Karl Schmidt
 Batrachuperus tibetanus K.P. Schmidt, 1929
 Eleutherodactylus wightmanae K.P. Schmidt, 1920
 Varanus albigularis angolensis K.P. Schmidt, 1933
 Leptopelis parvus K.P. Schmidt & Inger, 1959
 Neurergus kaiseri K.P. Schmidt, 1952

Publications
He wrote more than two hundred articles and books, including Living Reptiles of the World, which became an international bestseller.

Books
 1933 – Amphibians and Reptiles Collected by The Smithsonian Biological Survey of the Panama Canal Zone
 1934 – Homes and Habits of Wild Animals
 1938 – Our Friendly Animals and When They Came
 1941 – Field Book of Snakes of the United States and Canada with Delbert Dwight Davis
 1949 – Principles of Animal Ecology with Warder Clyde Allee (1885–1955) and Alfred Edwards Emerson
 1951 – Ecological Animal Geography: An Authorized, Rewritten edition with Warder Clyde Allee, based on Tiergeographie auf oekologischer Grundlage by Richard Hesse. 2nd, John Wiley & Sons, New York
 1953 – A Check List of North American Amphibians and Reptiles
 1957 – Living Reptiles of the World with Robert Frederick Inger

Other publications
Schmidt, Karl P. (1922). The American Alligator. Field Museum of Natural History, Zoology Leaflet No. 3
Schmidt, Karl P. (1925). "New Reptiles and a New Salamander from China". American Museum Novitates (157): 1-6.
Schmidt, Karl P.(1929). The Frogs and Toads of the Chicago Area. Field Museum of Natural History, Zoology Leaflet no. 11
Schmidt, Karl P.(1930). The Salamanders of the Chicago Area. Field Museum of Natural History, Zoology Leaflet no. 12
Schmidt, Karl P. (1930). "Reptiles of Marshall Field North Arabian desert expeditions, 1927–1928". Field Museum of Natural History Publication 273, Zoological series vol. 17, no. 6., p. 223-230.
Schmidt, Karl P. (1945) A New Turtle from the Paleocene of Colorado. Fieldiana: Geology, published by the Field Museum of Natural History
 Schmidt, Karl P.; Shannon, F. A. (1947). "Notes on Amphibians and Reptiles of Michoacan, Mexico". Fieldiana Zool. 31: 63–85.

References

External links
 
 Chrono-Biographical Sketch: Karl P. Schmidt
 Karl Patterson Schmidt Guggenheim Fellows Listing

1890 births
1957 deaths
American herpetologists
20th-century American zoologists
Lake Forest Academy alumni
Cornell University alumni
Deaths due to snake bites
Deaths due to animal attacks in the United States
People associated with the Field Museum of Natural History
Members of the United States National Academy of Sciences
American people of German descent